Boquillas or Boquilla or variant, may refer to:

Places
Boquillas, Texas, United States; a settlement on the Rio Grande
Boquillas del Carmen, Coahuila, Mexico; a settlement on the Rio Grande
 Boquillas Port of Entry, Big Bend National Park
Boquillas Canyon, Big Bend National Park, Texas, USA; a canyon on the Rio Grande
Boquillas Formation, West Texas, USA; a geologic formation laid down in the Cretaceous
Playa Boquillas, Cazones de Herrera, Veracruz, Mexico; a beach
 La Boquilla Dam, Rio Conchos, Chihuahua, Mexico; a masonry gravity dam
 Playa La Boquilla, Puerto Ángel, Oaxaca, Mexico; a beach
 La Bouqilla, Valle de Bravo, Mexico, Mexico; a settlement
 Boquilla Creek Wildlife Reserve; see List of Puerto Rico landmarks
 Sector Boquilla, Rio Prieto, Lares, Puerto Rico; see List of barrios and sectors of Lares, Puerto Rico

Other uses
 "La Boquilla" (song), a 2005 song by Ska Cubano off the album ¡Ay Caramba! (album)

See also

 
 
 

 Boquila, a genus of plant